Aethiopicodynerus major is a species of wasp in the family Vespidae. It was described by de Saussure in 1853.

References

Potter wasps
Insects described in 1853